Bruce Ford Cortez (born October 29, 1945) is a former American football player who played for New Orleans Saints of the National Football League (NFL). He played college football at Parsons College.

References

1945 births
Living people
American football defensive backs
Parsons Wildcats football players
Missouri Southern Lions football players
New Orleans Saints players
Players of American football from Missouri
People from Carthage, Missouri